Drake House or Drake House Museum may refer to:

in Canada
 Drake House (Newfoundland), also known as "Drake House Museum", in Arnold's Cove, Newfoundland

in England
Drake House (Beighton), Beighton, Sheffield

in the United States
(by state then city)
Drake House (Prescott, Arizona), listed on the National Register of Historic Places (NRHP) in Yavapai County
Col. C.F. Drake House, Weiser, Idaho, listed on the NRHP in Washington County
John and Amanda Bigler Drake House, Winterset, Iowa, listed on the NRHP in Madison County
Drake House (Minden, Louisiana), listed on the NRHP in Webster Parish
Frances H. and Jonathan Drake House, Leominster, Massachusetts, listed on the NRHP in Worcester County
Drake House (Michigan), a Michigan State Historic Site in Breckenridge, Michigan
Edwin S. Drake Farmhouse, Northfield, Minnesota, listed on the NRHP in Rice County
Nathaniel Drake House, also called the "Drake House Museum", Plainfield, New Jersey, listed on the NRHP in Union County
Drake-Curtis House, Cochecton, New York, listed on the NRHP in Sullivan County
Elam Drake House, Columbus, Ohio, listed on the NRHP in Franklin County
Alonzo Drake House, Oakwood, Ohio, listed on the NRHP in Cuyahoga County
June D. Drake House, Silverton, Oregon, listed on the NRHP in Marion County
Drake Log Cabin, Apollo, Pennsylvania, listed on the NRHP in Armstrong County
Hattie O. and Henry Drake Octagon House, Huron, South Dakota, listed on the NRHP in Beadle County